Gephardt is a surname. Notable people with the surname include:

 Dick Gephardt (born 1941), American politician
 Chrissy Gephardt, daughter of Dick Gephardt who announced that she was gay

See also
 Gebhardt

German-language surnames